Kusuura Dam  is an earthfill dam located in Kumamoto Prefecture in Japan. The dam is used for irrigation and water supply. The catchment area of the dam is 7.8 km2. The dam impounds about 10  ha of land when full and can store 1068 thousand cubic meters of water. The construction of the dam was started on 1963 and completed in 1966.

See also
List of dams in Japan

References

Dams in Kumamoto Prefecture